Tsutomu is a masculine Japanese given name.

Possible writings
Tsutomu''' can be written using different kanji characters. Here are some examples:

勉, "make effort"
務, "affairs"
務武, "affairs, warrior"
勤, "diligence"
努, "strive"

The name can also be written in hiragana つとむ or katakana ツトム.

Notable people with the name
,Japanese manga artist 
, Japanese general in the Imperial Japanese Army
, Japanese tenor 
, former Japanese shihan
, Japanese football player
, Japanese politician 
, Japanese Greco-Roman wrestler
, Japanese film director
, Japanese wrestler 
, Japanese ice hockey player
, Japanese politician and Prime Minister of Japan
, Japanese rugby union player
, Japanese professional golfer 
, Japanese head coach of the Sun Rockers Shibuya 
, Japanese actor and voice actor 
, Japanese former manager 
, Japanese former Nippon Professional Baseball pitcher 
, Japanese voice actor
, Japanese ice hockey player, coach and administrator
, Japanese short track speed skater
, Japanese organic chemist 
, Japanese football player
, Japanese actor and stuntman 
, Japanese game designer
, Japanese volleyball player
, Japanese writer 
, Japanese linguist  
, Japanese engineer 
, Japanese cannibalistic serial killer and necrophile
, Japanese rower
, Japanese animation and sound director
, Japanese freestyle swimmer  
, Japanese Paralympic athlete  
, Japanese manga artist  
, Japanese football player
, Japanese professor of International Christian Studies
, Japanese footballer and manager
, Japanese master of Shotokan karate
, Japanese professional wrestler
, Japanese former cyclist
, Japanese politician 
, Japanese racing cyclist  
, Japanese career naval officer   
, Japanese politician
 Tsutomu Sato (ophthalmologist) (1902–1960), Japanese ophthalmologist
, Japanese windsurfer
, Japanese astronomer 
, Japanese alpine
, Japanese comedian and television presenter
, Japanese anime director
, Japanese-born American physicist and computer security expert
, Japanese football player
, Japanese manga artist
, Japanese former football 
, Japanese secretary general of Japan's Liberal Democratic Party 
, Japanese baseball player
, Japanese doctor and politician
, Japanese president of Fuji Speedway
, Japanese former baseball player, coach, and manager
, Japanese marine engineer
, Japanese actor
, Japanese physicist
, Japanese aikidoka
, Japanese artist and scientist
, Japanese freestyle swimmer

 Fictional characters 
 Tsutomu Goshiki (五色 工), a character from the manga and anime Haikyu!!'' with the position of wing spiker from Shiratorizawa Academy
 Tsutomu Ryuuzaki (竜崎 勤), a character from Tenjo Tenge

See also
 7713 Tsutomu
 Tsutomu Kanai Award

Japanese masculine given names